The 2017–18 1. FC Kaiserslautern season was the 118th season in the football club's history. The season covered a period from 1 July 2017 to 30 June 2018.

Players

Squad information

Friendly matches

Competitions

2. Bundesliga

League table

Results summary

Results by round

Matches

DFB-Pokal

Player statistics

Appearances and goals

|-
! colspan=12 style=background:#dcdcdc; text-align:center| Players transferred out during the season

References

1. FC Kaiserslautern seasons
Kaiserslautern